The Dewoitine D.1 was a French single-seat fighter aircraft of the 1920s, built by the French industrial company Dewoitine.

Development

The D.1 was the first airplane designed by Emile Dewoitine after he established his own company. The D.1 was designed to meet requirements issued by the French Service Technique de l'Aeronautique. It was a monoplane, with a metal oval-section fuselage with duralumin sheet skinning, and a metal strut-braced parasol wing with fabric covering. The first prototype (D.1.01) flew in November 1922.

Derivatives of the D.1 were fitted with V-8 (D.1 and D.8), V-12 (D.19 and D.27), W-12 (D.12 and D.21) and radial engines (D.9 and D.26) as well as a variety of wing designs. Radiators on the inline engine versions were mounted on the undercarriage struts (D.1 and D.8), on the sides of the engine cowling (D.1.01), ahead of the cowling on the nose (D.12, D.19 D.21), or under the nose (D.27 and D.53).

Operational history
The D.1 was demonstrated in several countries. Yugoslavia purchased 79, Switzerland two, and Japan one. Italy purchased one, but then constructed 112 of their own version under the designation Ansaldo AC.2.

Survivors

Ansaldo AC.2 MM1208 is on display at the Italian Air Force Museum at Vigna di Valle in central Italy.

Variants
D.1.01
the first prototype powered with a  Hispano-Suiza 8Fb V-8, and fitted with a parasol wing on a very short pylon with no cabane struts; (one built).

D.1
Pre-series aircraft, some without pylon and some with pylon to D.1bis standard; (15 built).

D.1bis
Improved version with wings raised  on a pylon.

D.1ter
Production standard D.1 with the wings supported on cabane struts. Most D.1s were built or modified to D.1ter standard.

D.8
A high-altitude D.1 with an enlarged wood wing and a high compression  Hispano-Suiza 8Fe V-8 engine. Submitted to the CEDANA (Commission dÉxamen des Appareils Nouveaux pour lÁeronautique) for the 1921 C1 fighter competition, the D.8 failed to attract an order due to the high altitude class specification being withdrawn. The sole D.8 set a number of closed circuit speed records in 1924; (one built).

D.9
The D.9 was a D.1 fitted with a  Gnome-Rhône 9Ab Jupiter IV radial engine and later an enlarged wing. It was entered into the 1924 C1 fighter competition. Although unsuccessful in France, ten were delivered to export customers including eight to Yugoslavia, two to Belgium, while three were built for the Swiss Fliegertruppe by EKW, and 150 were built with additional modifications as the Ansaldo AC.3 for Italy; (thirteen built).

D.12
The D.12 was developed in parallel to the D.9 with a  Lorraine-Dietrich 12E W-12 for the 1923 C1 competition. Later fitted with a high compression engine the D.12 also failed to win a contract; (two built).

D.19
The D.19 was also built for the 1923 C1 fighter competition, and was fitted with a  Hispano-Suiza 12Jb V-12 engine. Two prototypes took part in the competition and two were delivered to Belgium, and one to Switzerland, while EKW built two more in Switzerland; (seven built).

D.21
Late in 1925 the second prototype D.12 was re-engined with a  Hispano-Suiza 12Gb W-12 engine. Intended for export the D.21 acquired orders for 3 from Paraguay, 12 from Turkey, and 8 from Argentina (including a prototype), where 30 were also built under licence by FMA, and 7 were imported from Switzerland where they had been built by EKW. The examples built by FMA had Lorraine-Dietrich 12Eb W-12 engines, making them D.12s, but the D.21 designation was always used. Three examples may have been sold to Czechoslovakia, where 26 were built under licence by Škoda Works as the Skoda D.1. (100 built).

D.25
Two seat fighter derived from D.21 for the French 1925 C2 (2 seat Chasseur or fighter) programme, but fitted with a Lorraine-Dietrich 12Eb W-12 engine. The four built by Hanriot were sold to Argentina after failing to win orders from the French. (4 built)

D.26
Trainer version powered with a licence built  Hispano-Wright 9Q 9-cylinder radial engine. Eleven examples assembled in Switzerland from kits supplied by Dewoitine. (11 built)

D.27
Fighter version powered by a  Hispano-Suiza 12Mc V-12 with improved chin radiator. The Royal Romanian Air Force operated 100, of which 97 were built by IAR, the Swiss Air Force operated 66, of which 65 were built by EKW, the Royal Yugoslav Air Force operated 4, all built by Zmaj, and 2 or 3 were exported to Spain. 7 of a further improved variant, the D.53 were used by the French Aviation Navale for deck trials. (179+ built)

Ansaldo AC.1
Sole D.1bis assembled by Aeronautica Ansaldo SA prior to production of the modified AC.2 version;(1 built).

Ansaldo AC.2
Modified D.1ter built under licence by Ansaldo in Italy for the Regia Aeronautica;(112 built).

Ansaldo AC.3
Licence production of a D.9 derivative for the Regia Aeronautica; (150 built).

Ansaldo AC.4
A direct descendant of the AC.2 the AC.4 replaced the Hispano-Suiza V-8 engine with a  FIAT A.20 V-12 engine. Flown in 1927;(1 built).

Skoda D.1
D.21 built in Czechoslovakia by Škoda Works; (26 built)

Operators

One D.1bis aircraft.

French Navy
Escadrille 7C1 - Escadrille 6C3 

Regia Aeronautica - One D.1bis and 112 D.1ter built by Ansaldo

One D.1bis aircraft.

Swiss Air Force - Two D.1bis aircraft.

Royal Yugoslav Air Force - 79 D.1 built by Zmaj

Specifications (D.1.01)

See also

Notes

Bibliography

D.001
Dewointine D.01
Parasol-wing aircraft
Single-engined tractor aircraft
Ansaldo aircraft
Aircraft first flown in 1922